This Land Is Mine may refer to:
 This Land Is Mine (film), a 1943 war film directed by Jean Renoir and starring Charles Laughton, Maureen O'Hara and George Sanders
 This Land Is Mine (1980 TV series), a Cantonese television series
 "The Exodus Song (This Land Is Mine)", a 1960 song with lyrics by Pat Boone, from music composed by Ernest Gold as the main theme for the Otto Preminger film Exodus
 "This Land Is Mine", a song on the 2003 Life for Rent album by Dido
 "This Land Is Mine", a 2012 animation of 4000 years of historical conflicts in Palestine from Seder-Masochism by Nina Paley.